Salem Township is one of twenty-one townships in Knox County, Illinois, USA.  As of the 2010 census, its population was 1,003 and it contained 449 housing units.

Geography

Cities, towns, villages
 Yates City

Unincorporated towns
 Douglas at 
 Uniontown at 
(This list is based on USGS data and may include former settlements.)

Cemeteries
The township contains these four cemeteries: Blakeslee, Summitt-Douglas, Uniontown and Yates City.

Airports and landing strips
 Tri-County Airport

Lakes
 Grandt Lake

Demographics

School districts
 Farmington Central Community Unit School District 265

Political districts
 Illinois's 18th congressional district
 State House District 74
 State Senate District 37

References

 
 United States Census Bureau 2009 TIGER/Line Shapefiles
 United States National Atlas

External links
 City-Data.com
 Illinois State Archives
 Township Officials of Illinois

Townships in Knox County, Illinois
Galesburg, Illinois micropolitan area
Townships in Illinois